Doug Rees (12 February 1923 – 2000) was a Welsh professional footballer.  During his career he made 356 appearances for Ipswich Town in between 1948 and 1959. He was born in Clyne.

See also
List of one-club men in association football

External links
Doug Rees at Pride of Anglia

1923 births
2000 deaths
Welsh footballers
Association football forwards
Ipswich Town F.C. players